Micropus californicus is a plant in the family Asteraceae which is known by the common name slender cottonweed. Its flowerheads resemble very small cotton balls, often rounded with cottony white hairs forming the pappus of each seed. The individual plants are known more informally as Q-tips due to their resemblance to the cotton swabs. It is found mostly in California, and into Oregon and northern Baja California. This plant is a resident of the vernal pool plant community.

References
  C.Michael Hogan, ed. 2010.  Micropus californicus. Encyclopedia of Life
 Jepson Manual Treatment

External links
Species account and photo

Gnaphalieae
Flora of California
Flora without expected TNC conservation status